"The Snuke" is the fourth episode of the eleventh season (or the 157th episode overall) of Comedy Central's animated comedy series South Park. It is largely a parody of the television series 24 and was originally broadcast on March 28, 2007.  The episode is rated TV-MA L.

In the episode, a new Muslim student joins the class, and Cartman immediately suspects him of being a terrorist. After finding out that Hillary Clinton is scheduled to campaign in town that day, he informs the CIA and does some research. The CIA shows up and detects the scent of a bomb deep within Mrs. Clinton. Through complex networking and investigating, the source of the bomb is found and the day is saved.

Plot
The episode begins when a new student enrolls in Ms. Garrison's class. He is named Bahir Hassan Abdul Hakim, a child of Muslim parents whose mere presence makes Cartman paranoid to the point that he leaves class, asking Ms. Garrison whether Bahir has been searched for bombs. 

Angered by this, Ms. Garrison tells Cartman to stop being so intolerant, stating that not all Muslims resort to terrorism, but Cartman states that while not all Muslims are terrorists, most of them are. Suspecting that the Muslim kid and his parents are involved in a terrorist attack, Cartman calls Kyle (who is at home in bed, sick), on his cell phone during recess, and Cartman asks him to do a web search for Bahir's background. 

Cartman also asks Kyle to see if there are important events that day, and figures that Bahir may target Hillary Clinton, who is in town for a political rally. Cartman takes this as a terrorist threat, then proceeds to call the CIA, stubbornly claiming that he will only speak directly to the President.

A short while later, the school is evacuated via a fire alarm and announcement from Principal Victoria. Bahir goes with Butters to hang out, and Butters starts to accept Bahir as a friend. As that is happening, the CIA calls Clinton's convoy to warn them of a possible threat. They decide to continue the rally, and as she is doing so, her security finds that there is a nuclear device in Hillary Clinton's vagina. 

This was referred to as a "Snuke" (a suitcase nuke designed to fit in a woman's "snizz") in Clinton's "snatch". To try to locate the detonator, Cartman tortures Bahir's parents by farting in their faces, which he's able to do so by injecting some apple juice into his veins. Cartman gets no response, and once he hears that Bahir is at Butters' house, Cartman runs off.

While Cartman attempts to accost Bahir while running away from Butters' house, a group of Russian neo-soviets abduct both Cartman and Bahir, the former for alerting the CIA to the attempted terrorist attack. While they threaten their prisoners, their conversation reveals that the Russians who placed the snuke are merely pawns in service of America's oldest rival: the British. 

The Russians are a distraction while an 18th-century style fleet of British wooden sailing vessels make a surprise attack to "put an end to the American Revolution". After Kyle, Stan, Homeland Security, the FBI, ATF, the Secret Service, and a single NSA representative take over Kyle's bedroom (and end up relieving each other of duty in the space of a few minutes), they all work towards finishing what Kyle and Stan had started: uncovering the terrorists' intentions, finishing just as Cartman finds out about the plan himself. 

They raid the mercenaries, but the Russians then warn the federal agents that the detonator is set to go off when the clock reaches 1:00. However, the power is cut and the clock is reset, blinking 12:00 repeatedly once the power comes back on. The various American federal agents open fire on the Russian terrorists and free Cartman and Bahir. Meanwhile, the United States Air Force attacks and effortlessly destroys the British fleet. Upon hearing the news of the attack's failure from the fleet's leader, the Queen commits suicide by shooting herself in the head with a handgun.

Back in South Park, Kyle tells everybody that the moral of the experience was that one should not be suspicious of just one race of people, "because actually, most of the world hates America." Even though Cartman is now convinced that Bahir is innocent, he refuses to apologize for falsely implicating him, pointing out that if he had not suspected Bahir due to his religion he would have never called Kyle, and the actual terrorism plot would not have been solved. 

Therefore, he concludes, "racism and bigotry saved America," so no apology needs to be made at all. As Kyle tries to explain Cartman's conclusion is not the point, Bahir's parents show up and announce that they are leaving the country due to its intolerance and Cartman's torture. Cartman proudly responds: "Ok, who got rid of the Muslims, huh? That was all me."

Reception 

IGN gave the episode a score of 9 out of 10, judging the episode "amazing".

Parker and Stone mention in the commentary of "The Snuke" that the actual cast and crew of 24 watched the episode as it aired and were so delighted, they sent over one of the suitcase nuke props from the show.

In the United Kingdom, the scene where Elizabeth II commits suicide drew controversy.

References

External links
 "The Snuke" Full episode at South Park Studios
 

24 (TV series)
Television episodes about abduction
Bureau of Alcohol, Tobacco, Firearms and Explosives in fiction
Television episodes about communism
Cultural depictions of Hillary Clinton
Cultural depictions of Elizabeth II
Federal Bureau of Investigation in fiction
Television episodes about Islam
South Park (season 11) episodes
Television episodes about suicide
Television episodes about terrorism
United States Department of Homeland Security
2008 United States presidential election in popular culture
Cultural depictions of George W. Bush
Television controversies in the United Kingdom